Sir William Lewis Salusbury-Trelawny, 8th Baronet (4 July 1781 – 15 November 1856), was a British politician.

Born William Trelawny, he assumed in 1802 the additional surname of Salusbury.

He served as High Sheriff of Cornwall in 1811 and later sat as member of parliament for Cornwall East from 1832 to 1837. He served as Lord-Lieutenant of Cornwall from 1839 to 1856.

Salusbury-Trelawny died in November 1856, aged 69. He had married in 1807 Patience Christian Carpenter; they had several children. He was succeeded by his second son John as his eldest son Owen had died at a young age in 1830.

References

Sources

External links 

 

1781 births
1856 deaths
Baronets in the Baronetage of England
Lord-Lieutenants of Cornwall
Members of the Parliament of the United Kingdom for constituencies in Cornwall
UK MPs 1832–1835
UK MPs 1835–1837
High Sheriffs of Cornwall